Frederick II (died 1396) was marquess of Saluzzo from 1357 to his death. He succeeded his father, Thomas II of Saluzzo.

His mother was Ricciarda Visconti, a daughter of Galeazzo I Visconti, Lord of Milan and Beatrice d'Este. Beatrice was a daughter of Obizzo II d'Este by either his first wife Giacoma Fieschi or his second wife Constanza della Scala.

He inherited a marquisate impoverished by the recent civil war, and in bad relationships with the neighbouring Duchy of Savoy. Therefore, he felt himself compelled to seek help from France, swearing loyalty to Charles, Dauphin of France in April 1375. In the following forty years the margraves repeatedly asked the French help against Savoy: in 1376, for example, Thomas went to Paris, asking to King Charles V that the quarrel with Savoy could be debated at the Paris Parliament.

Frederick was eventually succeeded by his son Thomas.

Marriage and children
Frederick married Beatrice of Geneva. She was a daughter of Hugh of Geneva, Lord of Gex, Anthon and Varey (son of Amadeus II of Geneva). They had nine children:

Thomas III of Saluzzo.
Amedeo of Saluzzo, Lord of Anton and Varey (1396–1419).
Pietro of Saluzzo, Bishop of Mende (died 1412).
Ugonino of Saluzzo, Lord of Sanfronte, Morny, Monreale and Bastide.
Roberto of Saluzzo. A monk of the Dominican Order.
Giacomo of Saluzzo. A monk of the Dominican Order.
Polia  of Saluzzo. Married first Francis II of Carretto, Lord of Millesimo and secondly Framonte of Cars.
Violente of Saluzzo. Married Antonio of Porri, Count of Pollenzo, Pocapaglia, San Vittore and Braida, Marquess of Val Brebbia.
Constanza of Saluzzo. Married John III of Blois, Count of Sancerre.

He also had three illegitimate children, later legitimised:

Giovanna of Saluzzo. A nun.
Franceschina of Saluzzo.
Margherita of Saluzzo.

External links

1396 deaths
Marquesses of Saluzzo
Year of birth unknown